The Owendoher River (Irish: An Dothra Bheag, i.e. "The Little Dodder") is a small river in southern County Dublin, Ireland, the largest tributary of the River Dodder, and a part of the River Liffey system.

Course
The Owendoher rises in two main branches.  The larger branch flows from Glendoo / Glencullen valley, and meets the second, in turn formed from two streams, one sometimes called Kilakee Stream, from the slopes of Killakee Mountain, and the other Glendoo Stream, from west of Glendoo Mountain.  The two branches merge near Rockbrook Cemetery, along with another small stream from Woodbrook and Piperstown, and the Owendoher flows north to Ballyboden, and on to Rathfarnham, receiving the Whitechurch Stream.

The Owendoher joins the River Dodder south of Bushy Park near the former settlement of Butterfield, just south west of Rathfarnham village.

There were historically a number of mills on the Owendoher and its tributaries; none now operate.

Bridges
As the Owendoher now passes, in its lower reaches, through heavily developed areas, it features many bridges - from where the river joins with the River Dodder to its source in the south:
Road bridge - Dodder View Road - R112
Road bridge - Butterfield Avenue - R114
Pedestrian bridge - Glenbrook Park to Willbrook Road
Service road bridge - Otterbrook housing development
Pedestrian bridge - Fairbrook Lawn to Willbrook Road
Road bridge - Fairbrook Lawn to Willbrook Road/Ballyboden Road
Service road bridge (gated) - beside Boden Wood housing development to Ballyboden Road
Service road bridge - Boden Wood housing development to Ballyboden Road
Service road bridge - Edenbrook Court housing development to Ballyboden Road
Pedestrian bridge - Willowbank Drive to Ballyboden Road
Road bridge - Ballyroan Road to Ballyboden Road - R817
Abandoned bridge
Service road bridge - Hillside Park housing development to Ballyboden Road
Service road bridge - Owendoher Lodge housing development to Ballyboden Road
Service road bridge - Private residence
Service road bridge - Owendoher Haven housing development to Ballyboden Road
Road bridge - Ballyboden Way to Taylors Lane/Ballyboden Road - R113
Road bridge - Scholarstown Road to Ballyboden Road - R115
Service road bridge - Springvale housing development to Edmonstown Road
Pedestrian bridge - Springvale housing development to Edmonstown Road
Pedestrian bridge (wooden) - Crossing at old clothes mill
Pedestrian bridge (wooden) - 2nd crossing at old clothes mill
Road bridge - M50
Service road bridge - Private residence
Service road bridge - Edmonstown national school to Edmonstown Road
Road bridge - Edmonstown Road - R116
Service road bridge - Kilmashogue Cemetery
Service road bridge - Private residence
Road bridge - Tibradden Road
Road bridge - Cruagh Road (lower end) - R116
Road bridge - Cruagh Road (upper end) - R116
Road bridge - Pine Forest Road - R116

See also
Rivers of Ireland

Gallery

References

Bibliography

River Dodder
Rivers of South Dublin (county)
Rathfarnham